The Libertarian Party of Idaho, also known as the LPID, is the affiliate of the Libertarian Party in the U.S. state of Idaho. The current chair is Jayson Sorensen.

Although it currently has no representation in the Idaho Legislature, it is one of four major political parties in Idaho which have ballot access (Using the Ballot access definition of Minor vs Major party). The party promotes securing personal and economic liberties as its top priorities.

History 
The national Libertarian Party was founded in December 1971 in Colorado Springs, Colorado, and held its first national convention in 1972. However, the Libertarian Party of Idaho was not established until 1975 by D. Allen Dalton when it first announced his candidacy in the next elections.

Since its inception, the Libertarian Party of Idaho has held various elected positions mostly on local boards and city council seats. Generally, the Libertarian Party of Idaho runs about twelve candidates in each election cycle.

Party milestones 
 In November, 1997, Ron Wittig became the first registered Libertarian to hold public office in the state of Idaho.
 In November, 2016, US presidential candidate Gary Johnson achieved 4.1% (28,331 votes) of the popular vote, representing the highest percentage achieved for a Libertarian presidential candidate in the state of Idaho.
 In October, 2020, the Libertarian Party of Idaho represented over 1% of registered voters in the state for the first time in party history.

Former officials 
 Ron Wittig New Meadows City Council (1997-2001)
 Rob Oates Caldwell City Council (2003-2007)

Platform 

The Libertarian Party of Idaho follows the platform of the Libertarian National Committee. This platform is based on the party's Statement of Principles, originally adopted at a convention of the national Libertarian Party in 1974.

Economic Policy

LPID wishes to reduce market regulations across the board, particularly in the healthcare industry. It also wants to reduce taxation to businesses and individuals as part of an overall goal to reduce the power of the government.

Social Policy

The Party seeks to engage in reform to the American justice system, including an end to the War on Drugs. It also seeks to increase protections for gun ownership and the purchasing of firearms.

Chairs of LPID 
 Jayson Sorensen (2022-Present)
 Robert Imhoff-Dousharm (2022)
 Jennifer Imhoff-Dousharm (2020–2022)
 Rob Oates (2006-2020)
 Ted Dunlap (2004)
 Ryan Davidson (2001–2002)
 D. Allen Dalton (1975–1976)

2000 nominees for office
United States House of Representatives, District 1: Ronald G. Wittig

United States House of Representatives, District 2: Donovan Bramwell

Presidential candidate:Harry Browne got 3,488 votes (0.7%)

2002 nominees for offices
United States Senate: Donovan Bramwell

United States House of Representatives, District 1: Steve Gothard

United States House of Representatives, District 2: John A. Lewis

Gubernatorial: Daniel L.J. Adams

Lt. Governor: Michael J. Kempf

Secretary of State, Idaho: Ronald E. Perry

State Controller: Greg Nalder

State Treasurer: Sherwin M. Fellen

Superintendent of Public Instruction:Robbi L. Kier

2004 nominees for offices 
Presidential candidate: Michael Badnarik got 3,844 votes (0.6%)

2006 nominees for offices 
United States House of Representatives, District 2: Ted Dunlap

2008 nominees for offices 
United States Senate: Kent A. Marmon

Presidential candidate: Bob Barr got 3,658 votes (0.6%)

2010 nominees for offices 
United States House of Representatives, District 1: Mike Washburn

2012 nominees for offices 
United States House of Representatives, District 1: Rob Oates

Presidential candidate: Gary Johnson received 9,453 votes (1.5%)

2014 nominees for offices 
Gubernatorial: John T. Bujack received 17,884 votes (4.1%)

2016 nominees for offices 
Sierra Carta received 1,159 votes (7.0%) for State Senate District 29

John Charles Smith received 1,656 votes (8.6%) for State Representative District 11 Seat B

Christopher Jenkins received 889 votes (6.3%) for State Representative District 23 Seat B

Presidential candidate: Gary Johnson received 28,331 votes 4.1%

2018 nominees for offices 
United States House of Representatives, District 1: W. Scott Howard

Governor: Bev "Angel" Boeck

2020 nominees for offices 
President: Jo Jorgensen

United States House of Representatives, District 1: Joe Evans

 United States House of Representatives, District 2: Idaho Sierra Law

2022 nominees for offices

See also
 Political party strength in Idaho

References

External links
 Libertarian Party of Idaho

Idaho
Libertarian Party